is a Japanese football player, who last played for Melbourne Knights in the National Premier Leagues Victoria.

Playing career
Yutaro Shin played for Fukushima United FC and Azul Claro Numazu from 2012 to 2015.

In January 2019, Shin returned to Australia, signing for National Premier Leagues Victoria side Melbourne Knights.

References

External links

1990 births
Living people
Aoyama Gakuin University alumni
Association football people from Saitama Prefecture
Japanese footballers
J3 League players
Japan Football League players
Fukushima United FC players
Azul Claro Numazu players
Association football forwards
Japanese expatriate footballers
Expatriate soccer players in Australia
Sydney United 58 FC players
Melbourne Knights FC players